Jowen Lim Si Wei is a Singaporean wushu taolu athlete.

Career 
Between 2010 and 2014 he made three appearances at the World Junior Wushu Championships and became a two-time world junior champion. He also competed twice at the Asian Junior Wushu Championships and is a one-time Asian junior champion.

Lim competed in the 2016 Asian Wushu Championships in Taoyuan and was a silver medalist in daoshu and a bronze medalist in duilian. A year later, he competed in the 2017 Southeast Asian Games and was a double gold medalist. The same year, he competed in the 2017 World Wushu Championships and won the bronze medal in daoshu. A year later, he competed in the men's daoshu and gunshu combined event at the 2018 Asian Games and missed the bronze medal by 0.01. The following year, he was a double bronze medalist in daoshu and gunshu at the 2019 World Wushu Championships.

Competitive history

References

External Links 

 Athlete profile at the 2018 Asian Games

1999 births
Living people
Southeast Asian Games gold medalists for Singapore
Southeast Asian Games silver medalists for Singapore
Southeast Asian Games medalists in wushu
Wushu practitioners at the 2018 Asian Games
Competitors at the 2017 Southeast Asian Games
Competitors at the 2019 Southeast Asian Games
Competitors at the 2021 Southeast Asian Games
Competitors at the 2022 World Games
World Games silver medalists
World Games medalists in wushu
20th-century Singaporean people
21st-century Singaporean people